Noric steel was a steel from Noricum, a Celtic kingdom located in modern Austria and Slovenia.

The proverbial hardness of Noric steel is expressed by Ovid: "...durior [...] ferro quod noricus excoquit ignis..." which roughly translates to "...harder than iron which Noric fire tempers [was Anaxarete towards the advances of Iphis]..." and it was widely used for the weapons of the Roman military after Noricum joined the Empire in 16 BC.

The latter is the site of the modern Erzberg mine.

Buchwald identifies a sword of  found in Krenovica, Moravia as an early example of Noric steel due to a chemical composition consistent with Erzberg ore. A center of manufacture was at Magdalensberg.

See also
Iron Age Europe
Iron Age sword
La Tène culture
History of ferrous metallurgy
Toledo steel
Damascus steel
Wootz steel
Bulat steel
Tamahagane steel
Crucible steel

References

History of metallurgy
Industry in ancient Rome